Cicindela fulgida, known generally as the crimson saltflat tiger beetle or shiny tiger beetle, is a species of flashy tiger beetle in the family Carabidae. It is found in North America.

Subspecies
These three subspecies belong to the species Cicindela fulgida:
 Cicindela fulgida fulgida Say, 1823 (crimson saltflat tiger beetle)
 Cicindela fulgida pseudowillistoni W. Horn, 1938
 Cicindela fulgida westbournei Calder, 1922

References

Further reading

External links

 

fulgida
Articles created by Qbugbot
Beetles described in 1823